The Tainan City Fire Bureau Second Division is a fire station in West Central District, Tainan, Taiwan.

History
The fire station building dates back to the time of Taiwan under Japanese rule. A fire lookout tower was built in 1930, as the tallest structure in Tainan city center at that time. Two wings were added in 1937-38, and the building was then renamed Tainan He Tong Building, meaning Tainan Joint Government Offices: one wing housed the police headquarters and a kōban, while the other wing was (and still is) a fire station, with the oldest surviving fireman's pole in Taiwan. Since its inception, the building has undergone three renovations. The building was declared a historical monument in 1998.

Architecture
The fire station building is an example of Japanese-Western Eclectic Architecture, consisting of a three-stories structure, with the fire lookout tower standing up to seven stories high.

Transportation
The building is accessible within walking distance southwest of Tainan Station of Taiwan Railways.

See also
 National Fire Agency

References

1938 establishments in Taiwan
Buildings and structures completed in 1938
Buildings and structures in Tainan
Fire stations in Taiwan